Vinod Sagar is an Indian actor and dubbing artist working in Tamil, Telugu and Malayalam films, mostly as a supporting actor. Making his debut with Idhayam Thiraiarangam, he played almost 30 small roles, before getting noticed in Pichaikkaran in 2016, and then in the psychological thriller Raakshasan (2018), where he played a pedophile. Sagar played the same role in its Telugu version as well.

Career
Vinod Sagar, a B.A.Corporate secretaryship graduate, has also worked as Radio jockey for Radio Asia, Dubai (2005) and later enrolled with 'Theatre Lab', a theatre group before appearing in small roles in films like Idhayam Thiraiarangam and Naan. Sagar has also done prominent roles in the Tamil film Champion (2019), Nayattu (2021) and Jana Gana Mana (2022).

Partial filmography

Films

References

External links

Living people
Indian film actors
Actors in Tamil cinema
21st-century Indian actors
Year of birth missing (living people)
Male actors in Malayalam cinema
Actors in Telugu cinema